Courtès is a surname. Notable people with the surname include:

Alex Courtès, French artist and video director
Célestine Ketcha Courtès (born 1964), Cameroonian politician
Georges Courtès (1925–2019), French astronomer

French-language surnames